The Shanxi gecko (Gekko auriverrucosus) is a species of gecko. It is endemic to Shanxi Province in China.

References

Gekko
Reptiles described in 1982
Reptiles of China
Endemic fauna of Shanxi